Janette Turner Hospital (née Turner) (born 1942) is an Australian-born novelist and short story writer who has lived most of her adult life in Canada or the United States, principally Boston (Massachusetts), Kingston (Ontario) and Columbia (South Carolina).

Early life and education
Turner was born in Melbourne and grew up in Queensland. She studied at the University of Queensland and Kelvin Grove Teachers College, gaining a BA in 1965. She holds an MA from Queen's University, Canada, 1973.

Career

Her books are published in multiple translations.

Turner Hospital also teaches literature and creative writing and has been writer-in-residence at universities in Australia, Canada, England and the United States (MIT, Boston University, Colgate and the University of South Carolina).

She visited the Writer-in-Residence in the MFA program at Columbia University in 2010.

Honours and awards
Turner Hospital was awarded an honorary D.Litt. from the University of Queensland, Australia, for "services to Australian Literature".  She has won a number of international literary awards, including the Steele Rudd Award for Best Collection of Short Stories, 2012.  She was also a finalist (one of five) for Prime Minister's Literary Award for Fiction
and for the Melbourne Age Book of the Year Award for Fiction.

Bibliography

Novels
 
The Tiger in the Tiger Pit (1983)
Borderline (novel) (1985)
Charades (novel) (1988)
A Very Proper Death, as Alex Juniper (1990)
The Last Magician (1992)
Oyster (1996)
Due Preparations for the Plague (2003)
Orpheus Lost (2007)
The Claimant (2016)

Short story collections
Dislocations (1986)
Isobars (1990)
Collected Stories (1995)
North of Nowhere, South of Loss (2003)

Articles

References

Citations

Sources 

 Brydon, Diana. "The Stone’s Memory: An Interview with Janette Turner Hospital". Commonwealth Novel in English. 4.1 (1991), pp. 14–23.
 McKay, Belinda. "Transformative Moments: An Interview with Janette Turner Hospital". Queensland Review. 11.2 (December 2004), pp. 1–10 PDF for purchase
 Critique: Studies in Contemporary Fiction, (ed.) Donald J. Greiner, 48.4 (Summer 2007); issue dedicated to Janette Turner Hospital.
 Sibree, Bron (2007-08-06) "To listen and learn", outline of JTH's career and review of Orpheus Lost, in the online version of the New Zealand Herald [Accessed 2007-08-28]

External links
 
 Caught in the Creative Act
 Maureen Clark 'Power, Vanishing Acts and Silent Watchers in Janette Turner Hospital's The Last Magician ' JASAL 8 (2008)
 Bernadette Brennan 'Words of Water: Reading Otherness in Tourmaline and Oyster ' JASAL 3 (2004)

1942 births
20th-century Australian novelists
Living people
Writers from Queensland
Patrick White Award winners
Australian women novelists
21st-century Australian novelists
20th-century Australian women writers
21st-century Australian women writers
Australian women short story writers
Writers from Melbourne
University of Queensland alumni
Queen's University at Kingston alumni
Massachusetts Institute of Technology faculty
Boston University faculty
Colgate University faculty
University of South Carolina faculty
Columbia University faculty
20th-century Australian short story writers
21st-century Australian short story writers